Balahovit (also Romanized as Balaovit) is a village in the Kotayk Province of Armenia. The majority of the early settlers of the village immigrated in 1828-29 from Khoy and Salmast in present-day Iran, while some of the immigrants came from Bulankh. It was renamed Balahovit in 1968 at the request of an Armenian-American group, after one of the eight cantons (gavar) of Sophene in Greater Armenia, of the same name. The community has a school, house of culture, and a first aid station, as well as the site of Yerevan Veterinary Institute's experimental station. Balahovit had a kindergarten, but it was closed in July 2004 due to the deteriorating conditions of the educational facility. The local economy is heavily dependent on agriculture, based primarily on grain farming, orchard cultivation, and cattle-breeding. Balahovit has a small minority of Kurds (including Yazidis) and Russians.

See also 
Kotayk Province

References 

 
 World Gazeteer: Armenia – World-Gazetteer.com
 

Populated places in Kotayk Province
Kurdish settlements in Armenia
Yazidi populated places in Armenia